Elachista antipodensis is a moth in the family Elachistidae. It was first described by John S. Dugdale in 1971. It is found on  the Antipodes Islands.

Taxonomy
This species was first described by J. S. Dugdale in 1971. Dugdale originally believed it to be a subspecies of Irenicodes galatheae and named it Irenicodes galatheae antipodensis. In 1977 Ernst Traugott-Olsen and Ebbe Schmidt Nielsen confirmed that the genus Irenicodes was synonymised with Elachista. In 1999 Lauri Kaila raised this subspecies to species rank. The justification for this change was given in 2019 and was based on the differences in male genitalia between E. galatheae and E. antipodensis. The male holotype specimen, collected on Antipodes Island,  is held in the New Zealand Arthropod Collection.

References

antipodensis
Moths of New Zealand
Antipodes Islands
Moths described in 1971
Endemic fauna of New Zealand
Endemic moths of New Zealand